Wauregan is a village located in the northwestern corner of the town of Plainfield, Connecticut in the United States. Originally a mill village, Wauregan was established around a cotton mill powered by the Quinebaug River. Wauregan and West Wauregan, across the Quinebaug in the town of Brooklyn, together comprise the Wauregan census-designated place, with a population of 1,205 at the 2010 census.

A  portion of the original village area is listed as a historic district, the Wauregan Historic District, encompassing structures that are directly related to the economic and social activities of the mill. The district was listed on the National Register of Historic Places in 1979. Extant buildings in the Wauregan historic district include the Wauregan Mill, an H-shaped building built from local fieldstone; James Atwood's home; the two boarding houses; the company store; and over one hundred workers' houses. Architectural styles represented include Greek Revival and Late Victorian architecture.

History
Named for a Mohegan word meaning "Pleasant Valley" Wauregan has a long history as an industrial village. In 1850, Amos D. Lockwood, who was involved with the Quinebaug Mill in Danielsonville, bought the water privileges and surrounding land at Wauregan. After the Wauregan Mills Company charter was approved by the Connecticut legislature in 1853, the first mill was constructed circa 1853-1854. Wauregan Mills was well known for its woven cotton goods, including various types of flannel. Lockwood became the mill's first agent and recruited James S. Atwood as his superintendent, who became responsible for setting up all machinery and starting production. The principal product of Wauregan was cotton sheeting.

James S. Atwood, who purchased the mill from Lockwood in 1858, took particular interest in the village surrounding the mill, making it what he considered to be a "model hamlet" where his factory's employees "could find attractive and comfortable homes near their daily tasks." Under James S. Atwood's leadership,  Wauregan began to prosper. The mill was expanded, workers' houses were built, and several amenities to Wauregan village life were added. Worker housing in the village included 104 company-owned buildings containing 255 tenement apartments for rental to workers, plus two boarding houses for unmarried workers. A railroad station was built in 1859 and a post office was established in 1860.  A company store was built in 1875 and operated with subsidies from the company. Another building in the mill village housed a firehouse, clubhouse, jail, and a reading room and library. A dairy farm and nearby woodlands were also part of the mill operation. Atwood quadrupled the size of the factory, adding the south mill of the front block in 1859 and the entire rear block in 1867-68. The mill's labor force was around 750 people, with most living within the village. The mill would eventually reach a capacity of 56,616 spindles and 1,464 looms, with an annual output of eleven million yards.

When James S. Atwood died, management of Wauregan Mills was passed on to his twin sons, James Arthur and John Walter Atwood. The Atwood brothers continued to expand and improve the mill, which employed 325 men and 160 women and children as of 1917. The Atwood brothers successfully responded to the competition of the newer, steam-powered mills by producing finer quality cotton goods such as shirting for the U.S. Marine Corps, and later rayon, instead of the traditional cotton sheeting. Wauregan Mills had a close working relationship with DuPont and was one of the pioneers of synthetic fabric. This partnership led to the development of the technology to produce fabric made of a blend of wool and rayon. In contrast to many larger, corporate-owned mills that were wedded to a particular product, the economic organization of Wauregan Mills enabled its owner/managers to easily diversify and change its product mix to meet new demands resulting from competition from newer textile centers, allowing them to stay profitable through World War II, much longer than many other larger mills.

After World War II, Wauregan Mills entered a period of decline from which it never recovered.  In the 1950s, free trade policies with Japan, which had modern equipment shipped to them by the U.S. as part of post-war reconstruction enabling them to produce fine cotton goods much more cheaply, resulted in the death of the New England textile industry as cheap cotton goods flooded the U.S. market. Wauregan Mills tried to emphasize their capabilities in synthetic blend output and also to reduce labor costs by negotiating with the labor unions to eliminate certain fringe benefits. In August 1955, torrential rains from Hurricanes Connie and Diane caused many dams along the Quinebaug River to break, including the one at Wauregan. The mill was flooded to the level of the first floor ceilings. Workers tried to salvage as much cloth, raw materials and machinery as they could but ultimately the company lost more than $1,500,000. The company borrowed a large sum of money in order to be able to resume production but they didn't have enough working capital to repair and modernize their facilities. In 1957, James Arthur Atwood III, grandson of James S. Atwood, and the rest of the company directors decided to cease all operations resulting in the company's final closing.

James Arthur Atwood III was responsible for disposing of the company's assets to pay off their creditors. Land, the water company, and other properties were sold, and the mill rented to various tenants over the next decade. American Standard was one of the early buyers and built a manufacturing facility in Wauregan soon after the Wauregan company closed. All the debts of Wauregan Mill were eventually paid off in 1970. Since 1974, C&M Corporation, a vertically integrated manufacturer of electrical cable, has owned and occupied the former Wauregan Mills complex, where it operates a production facility and maintains its corporate headquarters.

The village is described as looking "much as it did in the 1850s."  The Wauregan Historic District was listed on the National Register of Historic Places in 1979.

Geography
The village is centered on the former site of the mill on the east bank of the Quinebaug River, near where modern Route 205 crosses the river. The village extends eastward from the river up a gently rising slope towards Route 12 located at the crest of a ridge. The mill workers' houses are located along Walnut and Chestnut streets just east of the mill site, while the supervisor's houses and the company store are located further east (and further up in elevation). The mill owners' houses and the church are even further up and east. The boundaries of the historic district exclude a large tract of open land to the north that the Wauregan company once owned. The district includes 114 buildings and structures.

The CDP includes, in addition to the original village, the village of West Wauregan across the Quinebaug River in the town of Brooklyn, as well as tracts of open land to the north, newer residential development to the south, and modern commercial properties along Route 12.

Demographics
As of the census of 2000, there were 1,085 people, 378 households, and 288 families residing in the CDP. The racial makeup of the CDP was 94.56% White, 1.29% African American, 0.46% Native American, 0.55% Asian, 0.65% from other races, and 2.49% from two or more races. Hispanic or Latino of any race were 3.87% of the population.

There were 378 households, out of which 50.0% had children under the age of 18 living with them, 48.9% were married couples living together, 19.3% had a female householder with no husband present, and 23.8% were non-families. 16.4% of all households were made up of individuals, and 6.3% had someone living alone who was 65 years of age or older.  The average household size was 2.87 and the average family size was 3.15.

In the CDP, the population was spread out, with 34.0% under the age of 18, 9.2% from 18 to 24, 34.0% from 25 to 44, 15.6% from 45 to 64, and 7.2% who were 65 years of age or older.  The median age was 29 years. For every 100 females, there were 96.6 males.  For every 100 females age 18 and over, there were 91.4 males.

The median income for a household in the CDP was $33,846, and the median income for a family was $30,795. Males had a median income of $33,224 versus $24,821 for females. The per capita income for the CDP was $15,311.  About 3.6% of families and 8.0% of the population were below the poverty line, including 6.2% of those under age 18 and none of those age 65 or over.

Notable buildings

See also

National Register of Historic Places listings in Windham County, Connecticut

References

Plainfield, Connecticut
Census-designated places in Windham County, Connecticut
History of the textile industry
Villages in Windham County, Connecticut
Census-designated places in Connecticut
Historic districts in Windham County, Connecticut